Moiyabana is a village in Central District of Botswana. The village is located 50 km south-west of Serowe, and it has primary and secondary schools and a health clinic. The population was 2,619 in 2001 census.

References

Populated places in Central District (Botswana)
Villages in Botswana